The Malaysia Nanban ("Malaysia's Friend") is a Tamil daily newspaper based in Malaysia, one of only three Tamil-language dailies in the country, alongside the Makkal Osai and the now-defunct Tamil Nesan and it is also the largest Tamil language widely-circulated newspaper in Malaysia, the Makkal Osai being second (excluding/including the now-defunct Tamil Nesan).

The daily circulation in 2012 was about 465,0000 copies and Sunday is about 115,000 Copy, The circulation peaked in 2000 with 65,000 copies sold. Nielsen report found it the highest selling daily Tamil newspaper in Malaysia and also outside India and Sri Lanka.

Currently Malaysia Nanban is the number one Tamil newspaper in Malaysia for almost 33 years at the leadership of Dato' Sikandar Batcha bin Abdul Majeed.

Overview

References 

Tamil-language newspapers
Newspapers established in 1986
Newspapers published in Malaysia
1986 establishments in Malaysia
Mass media in Kuala Lumpur